The men's singles wheelchair tennis tournament at the 2020 Paralympic Games in Tokyo was held at the Ariake Tennis Park in Kōtō, Tokyo from 27 August to 1 September 2021. However, due to weather conditions, the bronze-medal match was held until 02:00 in the morning of 2 September 2021.

Seeds
  /  (silver medalists)
  /  (gold medalists)

Draw

References 

Wheelchair tennis at the 2020 Summer Paralympics